Simone Borrelli (born November 5, 1985) is an Italian actor, director, singer, songwriter and musician.

Biography 
Simone Borrelli graduated in Acting and Dramatic arts at the Italian Academy of Dramatic Arts "Alessandra Galante Garrone" in Bologna.  In 2004 he won the "Giusto Monaco" vocational award for Best Young Actor.

He pursued his career with Acting Coaches/Members of New York's Actors Studio and at NYFA.

He works in Cinema, Theater and TV, with directors such as Gabriele Salvatores, Guido Chiesa, Gianpaolo Tescari, Lucio Gaudino, Carmine Elia, Vittorio Franceschi, Giovanni Pampiglione, Francesco Marino, Marina Malfatti, Lindsay Kemp, Eimuntas Nekrosius, Nicolaj Karpov, Susan Batson, Marilyn Fried, Steven Berkoff, Pierre Byland.

2008/2009: Borrelli was one of the lead actors, playing the character Mauro Morbello, in the TV series Terapia d'urgenza (produced by RAI – Radio Televisione italiana).  He was also a co-leading actor of the TV series Quo vadis, baby?; a series produced by SKY Cinema and directed by the Academy Award Winner, Gabriele Salvatores, and co-directed by Guido Chiesa.

In 2011 Simone Borrelli played the role of Ivan in Anna e i cinque directed by Franco Amurri and produced by Magnolia for Mediaset.

In 2006, Borrelli was the lead actor in the theatre performance AMADE in which he played Wolfgang Amadeus Mozart.  The play celebrated the 250th anniversary of Mozart's birth, and was produced by the Teatro Comunale di Bologna and Aterballetto.

In 2007, as an actor and dancer, Borrelli took part in the European tour of Sinfonia, directed by Silvia Traversi (Folkwang Hochschule di Pina Bausch e Carolyn Carlson Company).
In 2009, Borrelli filmed, composed and produced "X tutta la Notte" and "Giselle", two music singles and Cinematographic Music Videos.  These were in the album VENERDÌ SERA, his first album as a composer and songwriter.

In 2009/2010 Borrelli was the face of the brand BETTER-LOTTOMATICA produced by Movie Magic International.
In 2010 Borrelli played the role of Andrea in Martino's Summer by Massimo Natale, starring Treat Williams. This film took part in the Official Selection of the Rome Film Festival that same year.
In 2011 Borrelli wrote the screenplay for Venerdì Sera, a film linked to his first music album. This screenplay was nominated for the "Solinas Prize".

In 2012, Borrelli was one of the new lead actors in the sitcom Camera Café in which he played the part of Mario.

In 2014 he was the scriptwriter, director, lead actor, singer and composer of the original soundtrack of Eddy, an international film about violence against children.  The film is supported by Unicef, Doctors without Borders, Ministry of Education, Universities and Research and Amnesty International.  This film was awarded the "Official Human Rights Movie 2015" by The Council of Europe.

Linked to this, the Italian Prime Minister, Matteo Renzi and the Presidency of The Council of Ministers of the Italian Republic decided to give Borrelli and his film their Official High Patronage for the film's high social, cultural and artistic significance.

Filmography

 Quo vadis, baby? (2007)
Una volta sola, mai più (2008)
 Terapia d'urgenza (2008–2009) 
 Martino's Summer (2010)
 Anna e i cinque  (2011)
 Camera Café (2012)
 Eddy (2014)

Theater

Romeo and Juliet  (2000)
Antigone  (2001)
Monsieur Chasse (2002)
Pericolosamente (2002)
La Patente (2002)
A Midsummer Night's Dream (2003)
The Trojan War Will Not Take Place (2004)
The Imaginary Invalid (2005)
Tingel Tangel (2005)
Spoon River Anthology (2006)
Viaggio nella città di Zeta (2006)
The Stranger (monologue) (2006)
The Liar (2006)

Discography

 X tutta la notte (2008)
 Giselle (2009)
 Il giorno di natale (2012) 
 Eddy (Original Movie Soundtrack) (2016)
 L'Amor (2019) - Universal Music

Videography

X tutta la Notte (2010)

Awards and accolades

Giusto Monaco Prize 2004 as Best Young Actor
Eddy –  Official Human Rights Movie 2015 for The Council of Europe
Eddy –  European 12 Star City Award 2015  - Paris

References

External links
  
 
 MyMovies
 
 FilmWeb – Poland
 MTDB – UK 
 
 Flixter – USA 
 Film Affinity – Spain 
 Primissima – Italy 
 Livingly Media/Zimbio – USA 
 De Cine – Spain 
 FilmItalia – Italy 
 MoviePlayer – Italy 
 
  Yahoo! Cinema 

1985 births
Living people
People from Crotone
21st-century Italian male actors
Italian theatre directors
Italian film directors
Italian male songwriters
Italian male television actors
Italian television personalities
21st-century Italian male singers